John Claiborne may refer to:

John Claiborne (1777–1808), U.S. Representative from Virginia
John Francis Hamtramck Claiborne (1809–1884), U.S. Representative from Mississippi
John Herbert Claiborne (1828–1905), Surgeon and physicist
John Claiborne (baseball executive) (born 1940), Baseball Executive